Elena Aleksandrovna Osokina (born 1959 in Podolsk, Soviet Union) is a Russian historian.

Personal
Her mother, Octobriana (later renamed Anna), named after the Bolshevik October revolution.

Education
Elena Aleksandrovna Osokina earned her B.A. and M.A. in 1981, and her Ph.D. in 1987, all from Moscow State University.

Writing
Osokina's first book, "Hierarchy of Consumption: Life Under the Stalinist Rationing System, 1928-1935" was released in 1993 in Russia.

In 1998, ROSSPEN published her second book "За фасадом «сталинского изобилия»: Распределение и рынок в снабжении населения в годы индустриализации, 1927-1941". In 2001, M.E. Sharpe Publisher translated this book into English and published it under the title "Our Daily Bread: Socialist Distribution and the Art of Survival in Stalin’s Russia, 1927-1941". 

Elena Osokina's third book "Gold for Industrialization: Torgsin" came out in 2009 in Russia. 
The book reveals the unknown story of Soviet industrialization and everyday life by exploring the role of the state stores, Torgsin (1931–36), which during the lean years of Stalin’s industrialization sold food and goods to the Soviet people at inflated prices in exchange for foreign currency, gold, silver and diamonds. Torgsin became an important source of gold for Stalin to finance industrialization and the major strategy for survival for people during those harsh times. The study enriches understanding of Stalinism, the workings of the Soviet economy, the nature of Soviet everyday life and consumerism.

Teaching
Elena Aleksandrovna Osokina is currently a Professor of Russian history at the University of South Carolina.

References

External links
USC College of Arts and Sciences, History Faculty: Elena Aleksandrovna Osokina

Living people
1959 births
Place of birth missing (living people)
20th-century Russian historians
Moscow State University alumni
University of South Carolina faculty
Economic historians
21st-century Russian historians
Russian women historians